Aasmund Bjørkan (born 3 July 1973) is a Norwegian former professional footballer who was appointed manager at Bodø/Glimt after the 2015 season. He had been the assistant of former manager Jan Halvor Halvorsen since 2013. He has previously been head coach of the First Division sides Alta and Ranheim. As a player, he played as a winger for Bodø/Glimt and Vålerenga, and won the Norwegian Cup in 1993 and 2002.

Playing career
Bjørkan made his debut for Bodø/Glimt in 1991, and helped win promotion ahead of the 1993 season. In his first Norwegian top division season in 1993 he played all 22 league games. He remained a steadfast first-team player at Bodø/Glimt until changing club to Vålerenga in the middle of the 2000 season. After some meagre seasons he returned to Bodø/Glimt in August 2002. He started off well, playing all 26 league games in 2003, but was eventually struck by problems with jumper's knee. He retired as an active player after the 2005 season.

Post-playing career
Ahead of the 2006 season he was offered the job as head coach of Steigen SK. This did not happen; instead he was hired at Bodø/Glimt as a player developer. Ahead of the 2009 season he was hired as the new head coach for second-tier club Alta IF. After two seasons there Bjørkan moved to become the new head coach for Ranheim from 1 January 2011, where he replaced Per Joar Hansen who took over the Norwegian under-21 team. Bjørkan led the team to a fourth and a seventh place in the First Division, and left the club after the 2012 season when his contract expired.

Bjørkan was linked to the vacant position as head coach of Bodø/Glimt ahead of the 2013 season, but after the club hired Jan Halvor Halvorsen as head coach, he was hired as his assistant coach. When Jan Halvor Halvorsen left Bodø/Glimt after the 2015 season, Bjørkan was appointed head coach. In his first season in charge, Bodø/Glimt was relegated to the 1. divisjon. Bjørkan stayed at the club, Bodø/Glimt won the 2017 1. divisjon with a 16 point margin, and Bjørkan was named the 1. divisjon manager of the year.

Career statistics

Managerial statistics

Honours

As a player
Bodø/Glimt
 Norwegian Cup: 1993
Vålerenga
 Norwegian Cup: 2002

As a manager
Bodø/Glimt
 1. divisjon: 2017

Individual
 1. divisjon Manager of the Year: 2017

References

External links
 

1973 births
Living people
Norwegian footballers
FK Bodø/Glimt players
Vålerenga Fotball players
Eliteserien players
Norwegian football managers
FK Bodø/Glimt managers
Ranheim Fotball managers
Sportspeople from Bodø
Association football midfielders